One North Pennsylvania, formerly known as the Odd Fellows Building, is a neo-classical high-rise building in Indianapolis, Indiana. It was completed in 1908 and has 16 floors. It is primarily used for office space.

Indianapolis-based Loftus Robinson LLC closed on the building on March 24, 2017, from Hollywood, Florida-based Naya USA Investment & Management LLC. Loftus Robinson plans to renovate the building's exterior and interior with the help of federal historic tax credits. The building is slated to become a Kimpton Hotel.

See also
List of tallest buildings in Indianapolis

References

External links

One North Pennsylvania at Skyscraper Page
One North Pennsylvania at Emporis

Skyscraper office buildings in Indianapolis
1908 establishments in Indiana

Office buildings completed in 1908
Neoclassical architecture in Indiana